Pierre le Blon was a Belgian fencer. He competed in the individual épée event at the 1908 Summer Olympics.

References

Year of birth missing
Year of death missing
Belgian male fencers
Belgian épée fencers
Olympic fencers of Belgium
Fencers at the 1908 Summer Olympics